Quantez Robertson (born 16 December 1984) is an American basketball shooting guard. Robertson has played for Fraport Skyliners since 2009. He played college basketball for the Auburn Tigers from 2005 to 2009.

College career
Robertson was named Outstanding Defensive Player of the Auburn Tigers three times. He is also the all-time leader in steals with 210 for the Tigers. In his junior year, he started all games for Auburn and averaged 7.8 points and 5.0 rebounds per game.

Professional career
In 2009, Robertson signed a contract with the German BBL team Fraport Skyliners. In 2010, he reached the BBL Finals and the Cup Final with Skyliners; both were lost. The 2015–16 season was a successful one for Robertson and the Skyliners. The team won the FIBA Europe Cup Final against Pallacanestro Varese and Robertson was named Final Four MVP. In the Bundesliga, Robertson was named the BBL Best Defensive Player.

The Basketball Tournament
In 2017, Robertson played for the Matadors of The Basketball Tournament. He averaged 7.0 PPG to help the Matadors make it to the second round where they were bounced by eventual champion Overseas Elite.

References

1984 births
Living people
American expatriate basketball people in Germany
American men's basketball players
Auburn Tigers men's basketball players
Basketball players from Cincinnati
Shooting guards
Skyliners Frankfurt players